Asta's Book is a 1993 novel by British writer Ruth Rendell, written under the name Barbara Vine. It was published in the USA under the title Anna's Book.

References

1993 British novels
Novels by Ruth Rendell
Works published under a pseudonym
Fiction set in 1905
Viking Press books